The Heart of Texas Wildlife Trail is a state-designated system of trails and wildlife sanctuaries in Central Texas in the United States. It is one of the four major wildlife trail systems designated by the State of Texas.

The trail system is divided into two main groupings of wildlife viewing sites. The first stretches from the Coleman area, near Abilene, through Austin and San Antonio, to Laredo. The second is a cluster in the Texas Hill Country and southwest Rio Grande Valley bounded roughly by San Angelo, Del Rio, and Fredericksburg.

Notes

External links
 Heart of Texas Wildlife Trails

Hiking trails in Texas
Protected areas of Texas
Protected areas of Coleman County, Texas
Protected areas of Travis County, Texas
Protected areas of Bexar County, Texas
Protected areas of Medina County, Texas
Protected areas of Webb County, Texas
Protected areas of Tom Green County, Texas
Protected areas of Val Verde County, Texas
Protected areas of Gillespie County, Texas
Birdwatching sites in the United States